Minolops cincta is a species of sea snail, a marine gastropod mollusk in the family Solariellidae.

Description
The size of the shell attains 6 mm.

Distribution
This marine species occurs off South Australia.

References

 Cotton, B.C. & Godfrey, F.K. (1938), New Species of South Australian Gastropoda; Records of the South Australian Museum v. 6 pp. 199–206, 1pl.

cincta
Gastropods described in 1938